Journey to Italy, also known as Voyage to Italy, is a 1954 drama film directed by Roberto Rossellini. Ingrid Bergman and George Sanders play Katherine and Alex Joyce, a childless English married couple on a trip to Italy whose marriage is on the point of collapse until they are miraculously reconciled. The film was written by Rossellini and Vitaliano Brancati, but is loosely based on the 1934 novel Duo by Colette. Although the film was an Italian production, its dialogue was in English. The first theatrical release was in Italy under the title Viaggio in Italia; the dialogue had been dubbed into Italian.

Journey to Italy is considered by many to be Rossellini's masterpiece, as well as a seminal work of modernist cinema due to its loose storytelling. In 2012, it was listed by Sight & Sound magazine as one of the fifty greatest films ever made.

Plot
Alex and Katherine Joyce (Sanders and Bergman) are a couple from England who have traveled by car to Italy to sell a villa near Naples that they have recently inherited from "Uncle Homer". The trip is intended as a vacation for Alex, who is a workaholic businessman given to brusqueness and sarcasm. Katherine is more sensitive, and the journey has evoked poignant memories of a poet friend, Charles Lewington, now deceased.

Much of the running time of Voyage to Italy is uneventful. The opening scene shows Katherine and Alex Joyce simply conversing as they drive through the Italian countryside; the only incident is momentary, when they stop for a herd of cattle crossing the road. Shortly after they arrive in Naples, the film follows them as they are given a lengthy, room-by-room tour of Uncle Homer's villa by its caretakers, Tony and Natalia Burton. He is a former British soldier, she is the Italian wife he married after the war.

The film subsequently follows Katherine on several days as she tours Naples without Alex. On the third day of her visit, she tours the large, ancient statues at the Naples Museum. On the sixth day she visits the Phlegraean Fields with their volcanic curiosities. On another day she accompanies Natalie Burton to the Fontanelle cemetery, with its stacks of unidentified, disinterred human skulls that are adopted and honored by local people.

Within days of their arrival, the couple's relationship becomes strained amid mutual misunderstandings and a degree of jealousy on both sides. Alex dismisses Lewington as "a fool". The two begin to spend their days separately, and Alex takes a side trip to the island of Capri. On the last day of the film, they impetuously agree to divorce. Tony Burton suddenly appears, insisting that they go with him to Pompeii for an extraordinary opportunity. There the three of them witness the discovery of another couple who had been buried in ashes during the eruption of Mount Vesuvius nearly two thousand years earlier. Katherine is profoundly disturbed, and she and Alex leave Pompeii only to be caught up in the procession for Saint Gennaro in Naples. The afternoon's experiences — seemingly miraculously — rekindle their love for each other. Katherine asks Alex, "Tell me that you love me!," and he responds "Well, if I do, will you promise not to take advantage of me?" The film concludes with a crane shot showing the continuing religious procession.

Cast
 Ingrid Bergman as Katherine Joyce. Bergman, a famed actress of the era, was then married to Rossellini. Journey to Italy was her third film with him. Some critics have suggested that their films together have autobiographical elements drawn from Bergman's and Rossellini's lives and their relationship.
 George Sanders as Alexander 'Alex' Joyce (credited as Georges Sanders). Sanders was a well-known actor of the era who had won an Academy Award in 1951.
 Maria Mauban as Marie (credited as Marie Mauban).
 Anna Proclemer as a prostitute. Proclemer, a noted actress, was married at the time to the film's screenwriter, Vitaliano Brancati.
 Paul Muller as Paul Dupont.
 Leslie Daniels as Tony Burton (billed as Anthony La Penna). Burton is an Englishman living in Italy and married to Natalie. The Burtons are acting as caretakers for Uncle Homer's villa.
 Natalia Ray as Natalie Burton (credited as Natalia Rai). Natalie is an Italian woman married to Tony.
 Jackie Frost as Betty.

Production
The film originally was intended as an adaptation of the French writer Colette's novel Duo; Rossellini was, however, unable to get the rights to the novel, and was forced to draft a screenplay that differed sufficiently from the novel. Rossellini and his co-author, Vitaliano Brancati, also apparently drew on a script entitled New Vine, by Antonio Pietrangeli, which described the argumentative relationship of an English couple touring Naples in a Jaguar automobile. The film's storyline about Charles Lewington, the deceased poet who'd been in love with Katherine Joyce, is considered to be an allusion to the short story "The Dead" by James Joyce.

Rossellini's directorial style was very unusual. The actors did not receive their lines until shortly before filming of a particular scene, leaving them little if any chance to prepare or rehearse. George Sanders' autobiography Memoirs of a Professional Cad (1960) tellingly describes Rossellini's methods of direction and their effects on the actors and production team.

Theatrical releases
The film was completed in 1953, but it took 18 months to arrange for distribution of the film in Italy. It was released in 1954 with the title Viaggio in Italia, with a running time of 105 minutes. The receipts and critical reception were poor. The film had been dubbed into Italian, and now is used as an example of "monstrous" difficulties with dubbing. In April 1955, an 88-minute version of the film, in English, was released in France as L'Amour est le plus fort. There was little interest in the film in the U.S. and Britain despite the fact that the film had been made in English with noted actors in the leads. An American version, with an 80-minute running time, had a limited release in 1955 with the title Strangers. In Britain, a cut version (70 minutes) was released in 1958 under the title The Lonely Woman. A 97-minute Italian language version with English subtitles was released at some point; it isn't clear why this version was created, given that the film's dialogue was in English, and the Italian language version had been dubbed from that.

Reception and significance
Journey to Italy performed badly at the box office and was largely a critical failure. It had a profound influence, however, on New Wave filmmakers working in the 1950s and 1960s. As described six decades later by film critic John Patterson: "French critics at the Cahiers du Cinéma – the likes of Jean-Luc Godard, Jacques Rivette, François Truffaut and Claude Chabrol – all saw it as the moment when poetic cinema grew up and became indisputably modern. Journey to Italy is thus one wellspring of the French New Wave. A film convulsed by themes of sterility, petrification, pregnancy and eternity, it finds its echo in such death-haunted Nouvelle Vague masterpieces as Chabrol's Le Boucher and Truffaut's La Chambre Verte." Filmmaker Martin Scorsese talks about the film and his impressions of it in his own film My Voyage to Italy (1999).

Today, Journey to Italy generally is regarded as a landmark film. Critic Geoff Andrew referred to it as "a key stepping stone on the path to modern cinema" in its shift away from neorealism, and A.O. Scott notes Rossellini's "way of dissolving narrative into atmosphere, of locating drama in the unspoken inner lives of his characters"; because Alex and Katherine are not developed through a conventional plot but instead spend lengthy amounts of time in boredom and dejection, the film frequently is cited as a major influence on the dramas of Michelangelo Antonioni and later works about modern malaise. The film is ranked 41st in the 2012 survey of film critics conducted by Sight & Sound magazine, under the auspices of the British Film Institute. It is ranked 71st in an overall aggregation of several "greatest films" surveys.

The Japanese filmmaker Akira Kurosawa cited this movie as one of his 100 favorite films.

Home media and restoration
There have been several releases of Journey to Italy for home video. In 2013, the Criterion Collection released a newly restored version as a region 1 DVD. An earlier DVD version was released in 2003 as a region 2 DVD by the British Film Institute. It was reviewed then by Gary Tooze. A VHS tape version was released in 1992.

References

Further reading
 

  A contemporary, highly favorable review.

External links 
 
 
Journey to Italy: Fun Couples an essay by Paul Thomas at the Criterion Collection

1950s Italian-language films
English-language Italian films
English-language French films
Films directed by Roberto Rossellini
1954 drama films
1954 films
French drama films
Italian drama films
French black-and-white films
Italian black-and-white films
Films set in Naples
Films based on works by Colette
Films based on French novels
Italian neorealist films
Films scored by Renzo Rossellini
1950s Italian films
1950s French films